Farideh Firoozbakht (18 March 1962 – 24 December 2019) was an Iranian mathematician. She stated Firoozbakht's conjecture on the distribution of prime numbers in 1982. She studied pharmacology and later mathematics at the University of Isfahan and taught mathematics at Iranian universities including the University of Isfahan.

References

1962 births
2019 deaths
20th-century Iranian mathematicians
20th-century women mathematicians
21st-century women mathematicians
21st-century Iranian mathematicians
Academic staff of the University of Isfahan